Danilovsky District is an administrative district (raion), one of the thirty-three in Volgograd Oblast, Russia. As a municipal division, it is incorporated as Danilovsky Municipal District. It is located in the north of the oblast. Its administrative center is the urban locality (a work settlement) of Danilovka. As of the 2010 Census, the total population of the district was 16,908, with the population of Danilovka accounting for 31.4% of that number.

References

Notes

Sources

Districts of Volgograd Oblast